Mirapakay ( Chili) is a 2011 Indian Telugu-language action comedy film directed by Harish Shankar. Produced by Ramesh Puppala under Yellow Flowers banner, it stars Ravi Teja, Richa Gangopadhyay, and Deeksha Seth with music scored by S. Thaman. The film was released on 12 January 2011. It is successful at the box office completing 50 days theatrical run in 113 centers. The film has been dubbed in Hindi as Khallas and into Tamil as Murattu Singam.

Plot
Rishi (Ravi Teja) is an inspector in the Intelligence Bureau. His colleagues fondly call him 'Mirapakaay'. IB chief Murthy (Nagababu) gets information that mafia don Kittu (Prakash Raj) is trying to spread his tentacles in India and is targeting Delhi first. During the course of the investigation, ACP Srinivas (Sanjay Swaroop) is killed by Shankar (Kota Srinivasa Rao), a local goon, with the help of his son Linga (Supreeth). Murthy sends Rishi to Hyderabad and gets him admitted to a college as a Hindi lecturer as part of an undercover operation. Rishi meets Vinamra (Richa Gangopadhyay) at a temple and falls in love at first sight. Incidentally, she studies in the same college and in the same class to which Rishi teaches Hindi. Their love blossoms. At this juncture, Vaishali (Deeksha Seth), Kittu's daughter, joins the same college. Grabbing the opportunity, Murthy asks Rishi to extract information about Kittu from Vaishali by flirting with her and making her fall in love. Rishi makes Vaishali fall for him and reaches Kittu after killing Shankar and Linga. He finally arrests Kittu and his gang. The film ends with Rishi convincing Vinamra to marry him.

Cast

Production
After the failure of Shock, Harish Shankar faced struggles in his career. He narrated the script of Mirapakaay in the title Romantic Rishi first to Pawan Kalyan, After listening to interval episode, Pawan Kalyan gave him a go-ahead. But that project didn't materialise due to certain reasons. It was Ravi Teja who gave Harish's birth and rebirth as a director. During the shooting time of Shock he said that he would do another film with him irrespective of the commercial outcome of Shock. Harish was feeling guilty all this while and didn't approach him. He called him and asked for a story. Then he narrated the script of Mirapakai. Richa Gangopadhyay was signed after the director of the film, Harish Shankar, had noticed her at the success party of her previous film Leader. He initially offered her the role played by Deeksha as she was an NRI, but when they met to review the script, he was convinced that she would do justice to the character of Vinambra, a traditional Brahmin girl.

Soundtrack

The audio of the film was launched on 5 December 2010 at Taj Deccan Hotel, Hyderabad. T.G. Venkatesh, Ram Gopal Varma and Atchi Reddy launched audio cassettes, CDs and trailers respectively. D Rama Naidu, SS Rajamouli, Ravi Teja, Harish Shankar, VV Vinayak, Gopichand Malineni, Vamsi Paidipalli, Chandra Bose, Nikhil, S. Thaman, Sunil and others attended the function. The songs "Vaishali", "Silakaa" and "Dhinaku Dhin" were reused by Thaman in Tamil films Osthe and Ishtam respectively.

Reception
Oneindia Entertainment gave a review stating "Mass Raja Ravi Teja has got an unofficial promotion as Mass Maharaja as per the titles of this film. The film appears to be on the lines of Ravi Teja's earlier hits like Anjaneyulu, Vikramarkudu and Don Seenu. The audiences could enjoy the film in a festival mood and relax without cursing the hero or the director." Sify.com gave a review stating "Despite a banal storyline, the film has entertainment value, punch and a decent presentation. The director purely depends on the energy levels of Ravi Teja and the comedy angle. Ravi Teja proves that he can hold the audience purely with his high-energy levels in action, comedy and romance scenes. He is the life and blood of the movie. You can't go wrong with a title as racy as Mirapakay. And fortunately, this Ravi Teja starrer comes as a pucca mass entertainer for Sankranthi." Supergoodmovies.com gave a review stating "If you have no complaints to watch an entertaining film even though it is a routine fare, then you can happily go for Mirapakay. On content wise this Mirapakaya isn’t spicy." telugucinema.com gave a review stating "If you are not tired of seeing Ravi Teja doing same role again and again, showing off same histrionics without much variation, then Mirapakay may seem time-pass one. For others, it looks tepid and boring." chitramala.in gave a review stating "A middle aged married man was once talking to me about ‘Anjaneyulu’ and I tried my best to keep him away from the film and then he says "Ravi Teja’s film has a minimum guarantee, there’ll be jokes, there are fun songs and there’s Ravi Teja. So it’s a safe bet for a movie outing with the wife". A minimum guarantee." 123telugu.com gave a review stating "Mirapakaya, at the end of the day is pure Tollywood tamasha. It's a Ravi Teja movie and he never disappoints a fan who is in search of some good old fun. And whats more it is festival time and a few laughs will definitely do you a world of good." telugu.way2movies.com gave a review stating "Ravi Teja is the only aspect to watch Mirapakaay, It doesn’t offer anything new, a simple Police catching thief, How? Is the story. Mirapakaay have lots of action mixed comedy as we find in all recent movies of Ravi Teja. Watch it for Ravi Teja." idlebrain.com gave a review stating "It is a proven fact that Ravi Teja’s movies have scant respect for story and screenplay and majorly depend on the entertainment aspect. The entertainment is interesting in parts. We have to wait and see how Mirapakai is lapped up by the crowds."

References

External links

2011 films
Indian action films
2011 masala films
Films directed by Harish Shankar
2010s Telugu-language films
Films scored by Thaman S
2011 action films